Princeton High School is a public high school located in Princeton, Texas (USA). It is part of the Princeton Independent School District located in central Collin County and classified as a 5A school by the UIL. In 2017, the school was rated "Met Standard" by the Texas Education Agency. The school will be competing in the 5A classification as of Fall 2018. As of the 2021-2022 school year, the high school will be separated into a 10-12 high school due to the creation of Lovelady High School. In the 2023-2024 school year, Princeton High School will be an upperclassman (11-12) high school with Lovelady being an underclassman (9-10) high school.

Athletics
The Princeton Panthers participates in the following sports:

 Baseball
 Basketball
 Cross Country
 Football
 Golf
 Powerlifting
 Soccer
 Softball
 Tennis
 Track & Field
 Volleyball
 Wrestling

Football
The Princeton football team has made playoff appearances 13 times in 1948, 1972, 1974, 1975, 1976, 2010, 2011, 2012, 2013, 2014, 2015, 2016 and 2017. Princeton won district championships in 1948, 1972, 1974, 1975 and 1976 when only one team per district made the playoffs. In the new format where 4 teams from each district make the playoffs, Princeton has added two more district championships in 2013 and 2017.

Basketball
PHS men's and women's basketball teams have experienced success over the years. The 1994-95 men's team finished with a record of 30–5, finishing the season as district 9-3A Runner-up and Area Champions after defeating West High School in the playoffs. In the Mid 2000s, Princeton was led by head coach Robert Erger, when they had a stint ranked as the #1 3A boys basketball program in the state of Texas.

Marching Band
The "Panther Pride Marching Band" has made appearances at the UIL State Marching Band Contest on many consecutive occasions, earning the bronze medal three times; once in 2010, again in 2014, and in 2016. The band has been well represented locally and at the state level since the early 1970s.

Extracurricular activities
Princeton High School offers an extensive amount of extracurricular activities and programs, including Speech, Debate, Theatre, UIL Academics, Band, Choir, Winterguard, Art Club, Robotics, Fishing, Journalism, Student Council, Welding, Cheerleading, National Honor Society, Junior Reserve Officers' Training Corps (JROTC), The Fellowship for Christian Athletes, Future Farmers of America (FFA), Spanish Club. The school also has a widely recognized Career and Technology Exploration (CATE) program that serves Princeton High School students and others from the area's surrounding schools.

References

External links
 
 Princeton Independent School District

High schools in Collin County, Texas
Public high schools in Texas